was a monthly manga magazine published by Gakudōsha between December 1947 and October 1955. The magazine was important in forming and promoting shōnen manga in post-war Japan.

Legacy 
The magazine was first published on 20 December 1947.

The magazine under the editorship of Kenichi Katō motivated its readers in its unique "readers section" to send in their own comics to the magazine for competitions. Many new artists emerged due to this; for example Yoshihiro Tatsumi and Hideko Mizuno at a young age sent in manga to competitions of the magazine. Young artists published in the magazine were often contacted by other publishers for commissions. Shotaro Ishinomori, Fujiko Fujio, Jirō Tsunoda and Leiji Matsumoto started their professional careers in the magazine. Tezuka founded his magazine COM in 1967 with the intention to give space for new manga artists to experiment, like Manga Shōnen had been during its existence.

The magazine managed to capture the new graphic developments of story manga, as it was popular in the Osaka-based akahon market and gained a big readership. Kenichi Katō had previously been the editor of the popular boys magazine Shōnen Club at Kodansha and had good connections to some of the most popular artists at the time. Kimba the White Lion by Osamu Tezuka was the most popular series from the magazine.

Features 
Among the series featured in the magazine were:
 Bat Kid by Kazuo Inoue and Eiichi Fukui (1947-1949)
 Kimba the White Lion by Osamu Tezuka (1950-1954)
 Manga Classroom by Osamu Tezuka (1952-1954)
 Donmai-kun (ドンマイ君) by Eiichi Fukui
 Phoenix by Osamu Tezuka (1954-1955)
 Nikyū Tenshi (二級天使) by Shotaro Ishinomori (1955)

References 

1947 establishments in Japan
1955 disestablishments in Japan
Defunct magazines published in Japan
Magazines established in 1947
Magazines disestablished in 1955
Magazines published in Tokyo
Shōnen manga
Monthly manga magazines published in Japan